Secilil Eldebechel is a Palauan politician, who has served as a delegate representing the State of Ngchesar in the House of Delegates of Palau. He was appointed as minister of finance in 2013, but was not confirmed by the Senate. Was later becoming the Chief of Staff to The Administration of former President Thomas Remengesau Jr. For 8 years. Then he went on to win his 2020 election to the 11th OEK Senate of Palau, where he serves as the Floor Leader.

References 

Year of birth missing (living people)
Living people
Members of the House of Delegates of Palau
Members of the Senate of Palau